Alex Tait may refer to:
Alex Tait (poet) (born 1720), Scottish poet
Alex Tait (cricketer) (born 1972), New Zealand cricketer
Alex Tait (footballer) (born 1933), English footballer
Alex Tait (rugby union) (born 1988), English rugby union player

See also
Sandy Tait (Alexander Tait, 1873–1949), footballer